This article contains lists of visits and trips by the president of the United States.

Visits by state or territory
 List of presidential visits to North Dakota
 List of United States presidential visits to Puerto Rico

International trips
 List of international trips made by presidents of the United States

Trips by president

Ronald Reagan
 List of international presidential trips made by Ronald Reagan

George H. W. Bush
 List of international presidential trips made by George H. W. Bush

Bill Clinton
 List of international presidential trips made by Bill Clinton

George W. Bush
 List of international presidential trips made by George W. Bush

Barack Obama
 List of international presidential trips made by Barack Obama
 List of presidential trips made by Barack Obama (2009)
 List of presidential trips made by Barack Obama (2010)
 List of presidential trips made by Barack Obama (2011)
 List of presidential trips made by Barack Obama (2012)
 List of presidential trips made by Barack Obama (2013)
 List of presidential trips made by Barack Obama (2014)
 List of presidential trips made by Barack Obama (2015)
 List of presidential trips made by Barack Obama (2016)

Donald Trump
 List of international presidential trips made by Donald Trump
 List of presidential trips made by Donald Trump (2017)
 List of presidential trips made by Donald Trump (2018)
 List of presidential trips made by Donald Trump (2019)
 List of presidential trips made by Donald Trump (2020)

Joe Biden
 List of international presidential trips made by Joe Biden
 List of presidential trips made by Joe Biden (2021)
 List of presidential trips made by Joe Biden (2022)
 List of presidential trips made by Joe Biden (2023)

Trips by region

Americas
 United States presidential visits to Canada
 United States presidential visits to Mexico
 United States presidential visits to Central America
 United States presidential visits to the Caribbean
 United States presidential visits to South America

Asia
 United States presidential visits to East Asia
 United States presidential visits to South Asia
 United States presidential visits to Southeast Asia

Europe
 United States presidential visits to Eastern Europe and Northern Asia
 United States presidential visits to Northern Europe
 United States presidential visits to Southern Europe
 United States presidential visits to Western Europe
 United States presidential visits to the United Kingdom and Ireland

Other
 United States presidential visits to Australia and New Zealand
 United States presidential visits to the Middle East
 United States presidential visits to North Africa
 United States presidential visits to Sub-Saharan Africa